Asinara is the second largest island of Sardinia after Sant'Antioco. It houses a great variety of habitats. The island has an extremely odd historical, environmental, and legal status. It is known as "Isola del Diavolo" ("Devil's Island"), since it was used as a quarantine location, as a prison camp during the First World War, and as one of the most important Italian high security prisons during the terrorist period of the 1970s and during the struggle against organized crime, until the establishment of a National Park in 1998.

See also 
 Asinara
 Porto Torres

References
 Yearbook of the Italian Parks 2005, edited by Comunicazione in association with Federparchi and the Italian State Tourism Board

External links
 Pages by the Park Authority on Parks.it

National parks of Italy
Parks in Sardinia
Protected areas established in 1997
Islands of Sardinia